Rehearsal is the second studio album by Australian surf music and garage rock band Skegss, released on 26 March 2021. The album debuted at number one on the ARIA Albums Chart. Upon announcement, Skegss' Ben Reed said he was "not expecting it", and CEO of ARIA Annabelle Herd remarked that the band's "good time energy is exactly what we need right now".

At the 2021 ARIA Music Awards, Chris Collins was nominated for Engineer of the Year for work on this album.

Track listing
 "Down to Ride" – 3:23
 "Valhalla" – 2:52
 "Fantasising" – 3:28
 "Running from Nothing" – 3:54
 "Bush TV" – 2:50
 "Picturesque Moment" – 3:06
 "Under the Thunder" – 3:37
 "Sip of Wine" – 2:54
 "Curse My Happiness" – 2:45
 "Wake Up"	– 3:48
 "Savour the Flavour" – 3:32
 "Fade Away" – 3:25
 "Lucky" – 2:43

Charts

Weekly charts

Year-end charts

See also
 List of number-one albums of 2021 (Australia)

References

2021 albums
Loma Vista Recordings albums
Skegss albums